This is a list of downloadable TurboGrafx-16 (PC Engine) games to be purchased from the PlayStation Store for Sony's PlayStation 3 (PS3), PlayStation Portable (PSP) and PlayStation Vita (PSV) video game consoles.

See also
List of DSiWare games and applications
List of WiiWare games

References

External links
PlayStation Store PC Engine title list (in Japanese). Hudson Soft.

 
 
 
PlayStation (brand)-related lists
PlayStation Store games